The Douglas O-31 was the Douglas Aircraft Company's first monoplane observation straight-wing aircraft used by the United States Army Air Corps.

Development
Anxious to retain its position as chief supplier of observation aircraft to the USAAC, Douglas developed a proposal for a high-wing monoplane successor to the O-2. A contract was signed on January 7, 1930 for two XO-31 prototype aircraft, the first of them being flown in December of the same year. A fabric-covered gull-wing monoplane, the XO-31 had a slim corrugated dural-wrapped fuselage, similar to the Thomas-Morse O-19, carrying a tandem arrangement of open cockpits for the pilot and observer. It had one  Curtiss GIV-1570-FM Conqueror V-12 engine and fixed landing gear with provision for large wheel fairings.

The XO-31 suffered from directional instability and experiments were made with various fins, auxiliary fins, and rudder shapes, in an effort to cure the problem. The second aircraft was completed as the YO-31, with a geared Curtiss V-1570-7 Conqueror engine and an enlarged fin, 3" longer cowling, and a two-blade, dextrorotatory propeller. Four YO-31A aircraft delivered during early 1932 were modified radically with an elliptical wing planform, a new tail assembly, a smooth semimonocoque fuselage, three-blade propeller, and a canopy over the cockpits. The aircraft appeared with a variety of tail units, the final version (five built) designated O-31A featured a very pointed fin with an inset rudder. The single YO-31B was an unarmed staff transport and the sole YO-31C converted from YO-31A had cantilever main landing gear, and a ventral bulge in the fuselage, which enabled the observer to operate his single 0.3-in (7.62 mm) machine-gun more effectively from a standing position.

Five Y1O-31C service-test aircraft were ordered in 1931, and delivered to the USAAC in early 1933 designated Y1O-43. They differed from the final configuration of the O-31A, with a wire-braced parasol wing, and a new fin and rudder.

Variants
Data from: "U.S. Army Aircraft 1908-1946" by James C. Fahey, 1946, 64pp.

XO-31 two built, Curtiss V-1570-25 Conqueror engine
YO-31B one built, re-designated O-31B, Curtiss V-1570-29 engine
YO-31C YO-31A with cantilever gear, Curtiss V-1570-53 engine
Y1O-31C five built, wingspan increased to 45 ft 11 in (14 m), became the Y1O-43, Curtiss V-1570-53 engine

Specifications (YO-31C)

References

External links

Boeing History
Aerofiles

O-31
Douglas O-31
Single-engined tractor aircraft
Parasol-wing aircraft
Aircraft first flown in 1930